The Whitney and Betty MacMillan Center for International and Area Studies at Yale, commonly known as the MacMillan Center, is a research and educational center for international affairs and area studies at Yale University.

Academics 
As of 2021, the Macmillan Center currently offers degrees for both undergraduate and graduate levels. Undergraduate degrees include African Studies, East Asian Studies, Latin American Studies, Modern Middle East Studies, Russian and East European Studies, and South Asian Studies. Graduate degrees offered at the center include African Studies, East Asian Studies, and European and Russian Studies.

Similarly, it is possible for graduating students to partake in a joint-degree program, where they can receive a master's. and an equivalent professional degree from one of four partnered Yale professional schools, with those being the Law School, the School of Management, the School of Public Health, and the School of the Environment.

It is also possible for those to pursue a graduate certificate of concentration through the Councils on African, European, Latin American and Iberian, or Middle East Studies in conjunction with graduate-degree programs at the Graduate School of Arts and Sciences or the professional schools.

History

The MacMillan Center was created in the 1960s as the Concilium on International and Area Studies and later renamed in the 1980s as the Yale Center for International and Area Studies (YCIAS). In April 2006, YCIAS was renamed as The Whitney and Betty MacMillan Center for International and Area Studies at Yale. As of 2021, the center is currently chaired by Dirk Bergemann, Douglass and Marion Campbell Professor of Economics at Yale University.

Jackson Institute for Global Affairs

In April 2009, Yale announced it had received a $50 million gift to create the Jackson Institute for Global Affairs as a part of the MacMillan Center. The institute opened during the 2010 fall semester and, as of 2021, offers an undergraduate major in Global Affairs, a Master of Arts in Global Affairs, a one year Master of Advanced Studies in Global Affairs for mid-career professionals, and a Multidisciplinary Academic Program (MAP) for Global Health Studies. The Jackson Institute began operating separately from the Macmillan Center in July 2015 and is planned to become a professional school by 2022.

Affiliated centers and institutes

Gilder Lehrman Center for the Study of Slavery, Resistance, and Abolition
The Gilder Lehrman Center for the Study of Slavery, Resistance and Abolition was founded in November 1998 by David Brion Davis and funded by Richard Gilder and Lewis Lehrman, founders of the Gilder Lehrman Institute of American History. Davis served as director till June 2004, when historian David. W. Blight, Sterling Professor of American History at Yale University, succeeded him as current director as of 2021.

The center's mission is to promote the study of all aspects of slavery and its legacy, with focus on the chattel slave system and its destruction. The center seeks to foster an improved understanding of the role of slavery, slave resistance, and abolition in the Western world by promoting interaction and exchange between scholars, teachers, and public historians through publications, educational outreach, and other programs and events. In addition, the center offers postdoctoral and faculty fellowships and summer graduate research fellowships, and also sponsors the Frederick Douglass Book prize, an award for most outstanding non-fiction book in English on the subject of slavery, resistance, and/or abolition for the year it is given.

Center for Historical Enquiry & the Social Sciences 
The Center for Historical Enquiry & the Social Sciences provides insight on the interplay between history and the present, focusing on large-scale social transformations and solutions to difficult social crises and problems. The center serves as a bridge between the humanities and social sciences in order to "better understand the world we live in."

Center for the Study of Globalization 

Founded in 2001, the Center for the Study of Globalization concentrates on issues of global development, financial globalization, multilateral trade, and global public goods, with priority for issues relating to global coordination and cooperation on climate change mitigation and global peace and security.

Center for the Study of Representative Institutions 
The Yale Center for the Study of Representative Institutions serves as an interdisciplinary pilot program with the intention of developing the study of the theory and practice of representative government in the Anglo-American tradition. It is supported by the Thomas W. Smith fund and the Jack Miller Center's Commercial Republic Initiative, sponsored by the John Templeton Foundation.

Notable alumni
The following alumni received either a B.A., M.A. or a Ph.D. in international relations. It is to note that the degree has been phased out and replaced by the master's degree in global affairs in 2013, which is also now provided by the Jackson Institute.
 Eric Alterman (MA) – political blogger, commentator on MSNBC, Professor of English at Brooklyn College
 A. Doak Barnett (MA '47) – scholar of Chinese foreign relations, Professor at Columbia University and fellow at the Brookings Institution
 Janet Beer (MA '95) – vice-chancellor of Oxford Brookes University
 Kenneth Brown (MA '60) – former U.S. ambassador to Republic of Congo, Cote d'Ivoire, and Ghana; President of the Association for Diplomatic Studies and Training at the Foreign Service Institute
 Randy Charles Epping (MA) – author a nd economist
 James H. Fowler (MA '97) – political scientist specializing in social networks, cooperation, political participation, and genopolitics; coiner of the term Colbert Bump
 Morton Halperin (PhD '67) – expert on foreign policy and civil liberties; served in the Johnson, Nixon, and Clinton administrations and then as Director of Policy Planning at the State Department
 Peter Hart (MA) – Canadian historian specializing in Irish history
 Heyward Isham (BA '47) – American diplomat, negotiator in 1973 Peace Accord with North Vietnam
 Scott Kleeb (MA) – Democratic candidate for U.S. Senate in Nebraska, 2008
 Michael Lind (MA '85) – writer, historian, and Policy Director of the Economic Growth Program at the New America Foundation
 Barry Naughton (MA '79) – Sokwanlok Chair of Chinese International Affairs at the Graduate School of International Relations and Pacific Studies at the University of California, San Diego
 Richard Nolte (MA '47) – American diplomat, Middle East expert
 Matthew Parris (MA) – English journalist and former Conservative politician
 Thomas Palley (MA) – Post-Keynesian economist
 Michael Rothschild (MA '65) – economist, William Stuart Tod Professor of Economics and Public Affairs at the Woodrow Wilson School of Public and International Affairs
 Pedro Moreira Salles (MA) – Chief Executive Officer (CEO) and Vice Chairman of the Board of Directors for Unibanco
Marcel Theroux (MA) – British novelist and broadcaster
 J. Ann Tickner (MA '60) – feminist international relations theorist
 Sergio Troncoso (MA '92) – short story author
 William Wohlforth (MA '84) – Daniel Webster Professor of Government at Dartmouth College

References

External links
 
 Councils, Institutes, and Centers of the Macmillan Center website

See also
 Yale Journal of International Affairs

Yale University
Schools of international relations in the United States